Nephelium xerospermoides, the hairless rambutan, is a species closely related to the rambutan. The drupe fruit has a flavor similar to rambutan. The fruit does not have any hair-like spines, hence its common name. They can be eaten freshly picked from the tree. They are not commonly grown or harvested for commercial use.

References

xerospermoides
Edible fruits